Patrick O'Toole (born 15 January 1938) is a former Irish Fine Gael politician. He was nominated by the Taoiseach Liam Cosgrave to the 13th Seanad Éireann in 1973. He was first elected to Dáil Éireann on his second attempt at the 1977 general election as a Fine Gael Teachta Dála for Mayo East. O'Toole was just one of a handful of new Fine Gael TDs in what has gone down in history as the biggest landslide election victory for Jack Lynch's Fianna Fáil party.

O'Toole served in both cabinets of Garret FitzGerald in the 1980s, as Minister for the Gaeltacht (1981–1982, 1982–1987), Minister for Tourism, Fisheries and Forestry (1982–1986, 1987) and Minister for Defence (1986–87). He retained his Dáil seat at each general election until he lost it at the 1987 general election. He was nominated to the 17th Seanad to fill a vacancy after the general election. He then retired from politics.

References

1938 births
Living people
Fine Gael TDs
Politicians from County Mayo
Members of the 13th Seanad
Members of the 21st Dáil
Members of the 22nd Dáil
Members of the 23rd Dáil
Members of the 24th Dáil
Members of the 17th Seanad
Ministers for Defence (Ireland)
Nominated members of Seanad Éireann
Fine Gael senators